Praveen Mayakar (born 8 January 1981) is an Indo-Swedish music producer, composer, singer-songwriter based in Stockholm, Sweden. He has been composing music since 2010 with a band and independent record label called MayaSwara, with a vision to support independent artists. He is also a writer, poet and photographer.

Biography

Early life
Born on 8 January 1981 in Dharwad, Karnataka, India Praveen was raised in Bengaluru where he completed his engineering studies at Dr. Ambedkar institute of technology. He worked in an IT company for a few years, after which he went abroad for higher studies. Even though he had a flair for writing lyrics, only in 2016 did he publish his poetry. His first book is a collection of poetry in Kannada that he began at the age of 8. His interest in music lead him to pursue the role of a musician and a music producer since 2010. He has released eight albums as of 2018. The catalyst was his move to Sweden to work with the Asea Brown Boveri (ABB) group.

Discography

Albums
 Annoyances (2010)
 Annoyances 2 (2010)
 Ignorances (2011)
 Acceptances (2012)
 Appearances (2012)
 Best of MayaSwara (2013)
 Experiences (2013)
 Grievances (2016)

References

External links
 http://www.mayaswara.com

1981 births
Living people
People from Dharwad